The 2009 Campeonato Brasileiro Série A was the 53rd edition of the Campeonato Brasileiro Série A, the top-level of professional football in Brazil. It was contested by 20 clubs starting on May 9 and ending on December 6. The 2009 edition was won by Flamengo.

The first goal of the tournament was scored by Igor on the 13th minute of the match between his team, Sport and Barueri, which ended in a 1–1 draw. Holders São Paulo had a bad start losing to Fluminense 1–0.

Internacional led the tournament from round 2 to 6, when Atlético Mineiro took the lead. In the 9th round, Internacional regained the lead but one round later Atlético Mineiro managed to come back to the top of the table after defeating their city rivals Cruzeiro 3–0. The club from Belo Horizonte held the lead until round 15, when Palmeiras reached the top. In the middle of the championship, Flamengo was only on the 10th position.

Palmeiras managed to stay in the top until round 34, when they lost 1–0 against Fluminense, which was struggling to avoid relegation. Four days earlier, São Paulo had tied 1–1 with Grêmio after having three players sent off.

Round 37 saw several changes in the standings. São Paulo could have won their seventh title, and fourth in a row, if they had defeated Goiás, exactly as it had happened last season. However, this time Goiás 4–2 win sent São Paulo from the top of the table to the fourth place. Flamengo defeated Corinthians and took the lead for the first time in the tournament. Internacional advanced to second place and in the last round, had not only to defeat Santo André but also count on their city rivals Grêmio to at least tie against Flamengo in the last match. Despite rumors that Grêmio would not play as hard as they could, Flamengo had to come back from a 0–1 score to win the tournament. Internacional 4–1 win was worthless.

Palmeiras also came to the last round of the championship with chances to end in the top position. For that, they had to beat Botafogo, which would be relegated if did not win the last match. The result was tragic for Palmeiras: 0–2 defeat that combined with Cruzeiro 2–1 over Santos left the team outside the top four and, therefore, out of 2010 Copa Libertadores. Botafogo, together with city rivals Fluminense, managed to avoid relegation. After spending 37 rounds in relegation zone, Fluminense, which managed to leave the bottom four positions one match earlier, held a 1–1 draw away against Coritiba and sent the team from Curitiba to Série B exactly when the club was celebrating 100 years of foundation.

The 2009 edition of the Brasileirão marked the professional debut of players such as Neymar.

Format
For the seventh consecutive season, the tournament will be played in a double round-robin system. The team with most points will be declared the champion. The bottom-four teams will be relegated for the following season.

International qualification
The Série A will serve as a qualifier to CONMEBOL's 2010 international tournaments. The top-three teams in the standings will qualify to the Second Stage of the 2010 Copa Libertadores, while the fourth place team will qualify to the First Stage. The next eight-best teams will qualify to the 2010 Copa Sudamericana. Should the winner of the 2009 Copa do Brasil finish better than 13th, the next best team(s) will earn the berth(s) it would have qualified for in the league standings.

Team information
Like in 2008, twenty teams will compete in this year's Série A. Defending champion São Paulo will have a chance to extend two records in Brazilian football should they win this year: first club to win four titles in a row, and first club to win seven titles overall. Of the four teams promoted from the 2008 Série B, one is new to the Série A. Barueri will be competing in the Série A for the first time since turning professional eight years ago. Four-time champion Corinthians returns after spending a single season in the Série B. The other teams promoted are Santo André (first return since 1984) and Avaí (first return since 1979). As is becoming common in Brazilian football, one of the country's most important clubs has been relegated after the previous season. For 2009, Vasco da Gama, champion in 1974, 1989, 1997 and 2000, will play the 2009 season in the Série B.

Managerial changes

1 Marcelo Rospide was interim manager since Celso Roth was sacked after Grêmio's elimination in the Campeonato Gaúcho 2009 on April 5.
2 Match played for the 2009 Copa Libertadores.
3 Interim coach Jorginho Cantinflas managed the team for 7 matches, until the 14th round.

Standings

Results

Top scorers

Source: globoesporte.globo.com
Updated as of November 8, 2009.

References

External links
Official webpage 
Official regulation 

Campeonato Brasileiro Série A seasons
1